Pseudomonas tremae is a white, Gram-negative, non-fluorescent, motile, flagellated, aerobic bacterium that infects Trema orientalis, from which it derives its name. It was formerly classified as a pathovar of Pseudomonas syringae, but following ribotypical analysis, it was instated as a species. The type strain is CFBP 3229.

References

External links
 Type strain of Pseudomonas tremae at BacDive -  the Bacterial Diversity Metadatabase

Pseudomonadales
Bacterial tree pathogens and diseases
Bacteria described in 1999